The 65th Separate Mechanized Brigade is a brigade of the Ukrainian Ground Forces formed in 2022.

History 
The brigade took part in battles in the Zaporozhye direction in December 2022.

Structure 
As of 2023, the brigade's structure is as follows:

 65th Separate Mechanized Brigade
 Headquarters & Headquarters Company
 1st Mechanized Battalion DaVinci Wolves
 2nd Mechanized Battalion
 3rd Rifle Battalion
 Tank Battalion
 Artillery Group
 Regimental HQ and Target Acquisition Battery
 Anti-Aircraft Defense Battalion
 Reconnaissance Company
 Combat Engineer Battalion
 Logistic Battalion
 Signal Company
 Maintenance Battalion
 Radar Company
 Medical Company
 CBRN defense Company

References 

Military units and formations of the 2022 Russian invasion of Ukraine
Military units and formations of Ukraine
Military of Ukraine